Constitution of Crimea may refer to:
Constitution of the Autonomous Republic of Crimea, the 'de jure' republic of Ukraine
Constitution of the Republic of Crimea, the 'de facto' republic of Russia since 2014